Wszechnica Polska University in Warsaw (Wszechnica Polska Szkoła Wyższa w Warszawie, formerly Wszechnica Polska – Szkoła Wyższa Towarzystwa Wiedzy Powszechnej)  is 
a private university located in Warsaw, Poland.

History
Wszechnica Polska University in Warsaw was established in 2001. The university continues the educational aims included in programmes of interwar Free Polish University and post-war activity of the Common Knowledge Society (Towarzystwo Wiedzy Powszechnej). In 2010 the university was formally entitled to grant MA degrees in Pedagogy and Philology; in 2013 – in Internal Security and Finances and Accounting. Within 15 years of functioning of the university about 7000 students of BA, MA and postgraduate studies have completed their education earning their titles and academic certificates.

The university is listed in the official registry of private higher education institutions (registration No. 195) of the Ministry of Science and Higher Education. It runs full-time and extramural courses within BA studies (1st cycle studies - the title of Bachelor or Engineer) and extramural courses within MA studies (2nd cycle studies – the title of Master). The central location of the university is the Palace of Culture and Science in Warsaw. The university has its own educational facility located at 10 Karmelicka St.

Education
Students are enrolled into the university without any entrance exams. During the studies foreign languages (English, Spanish, German and Russian) and Information Technology are taught. The university organises Polish Language and Polish Culture courses for foreign students.

Access to postgraduate studies is open to holders of BA or MA degrees.

International Exchange
Since 2007 Wszechnica Polska University in Warsaw has been applying the European Credit Transfer System (ECTS) and participating in students and staff exchange programmes under Erasmus. In 2014 the university joined the Erasmus + and the Scholarship and Training Fund (FSS).

References

External links
 

2001 establishments in Poland
Universities and colleges in Warsaw
Educational institutions established in 2001